Wan Da (October 1918 – August 7, 2002) was a People's Republic of China politician. He was born in Linzhou, Henan. He was People's Congress Chairman of Hunan.

1918 births
2002 deaths
People's Republic of China politicians from Henan
Chinese Communist Party politicians from Henan
Political office-holders in Hunan
People from Linzhou, Henan
Politicians from Anyang